Beeston with Bittering is a civil parish in the Breckland district of Norfolk, England.  According to the 2001 census it had a population of 505, increasing to 566 at the 2011 census.  It includes the villages of Beeston and Bittering.

References

External links

Civil parishes in Norfolk
Breckland District